Kottappadi Football Stadium, also known as Malappuram Stadium, is a historic football stadium in  Malappuram, Kerala. It is under the management of Malappuram District Sports Council, located right at the heart of CBD of Malappuram. Being one of the early places where football took its root, Malappuram is unequivocally considered to be the cradle of Indian football and this stadium owns much of its credit.The stadium also hosts an array of cultural and entertainment events throughout the year that have made it one of the most beloved places in the region.

History
Malappuram has a long history with football, its bond with the game dates back to British Era in India. The historic Kottapadi Maidan or 'Kavathu Parambu' as it was known back then, has witnessed endless football battles between the natives and Britishers. Built first as a stud farm before Independence, it became a march past ground for the British Army where they also played football that drew interest in locals. Then people of the town grew up seeing the elders playing barefoot with the British army men in the ground, eventually going on to become a symbol of Malappuram’s football-centric culture. The stadium also has contributed many football players to national and state teams. Late Irumban Moideen who started playing at Kottappadi joined Royal Indian Air Force and represented India as well as Pakistan and was a team captain. International Moideenkutty, who played for the State in Santosh Trophy and Railways football team worn Indian jersey against Myanmar and Russia. Malappuram Azees, Former Santosh Trophy star M.R.C Chekku, Ali Akbar and Goalkeeper Manjakandan Aboobackar etc. are few others who made in to the fame league. The stadium closed for renovations in 2010 and reopened on May 26th, 2014. Built under the auspices of the Malappuram District Sports Council with the financial assistance of the State Government and the Kerala State Sports Council.

Events
Post Independence, the first official tournament reported to have been hosted by the stadium was the Moidu Memorial All-Kerala Football Tournament held in 1952. All-India Civil Service Tournament, Kerala Premier League, State Senior Football Championship and a slew of district and state football championships were also organised here. On 2014 May 26th, Sri Thiruvanchoor Radhakrishnan inaugurated Kottapadi Maidan, a stadium whose history is steeped in the nation's football passion. Under the leadership of the District Sports Council, the renovation was carried out at a cost of Rs 8,000 to 10,000, allowing up to 10,000 people to comfortably watch matches. Amenities such as dressing rooms and VIP pavilions for two teams were also installed. Complementing these features is a shopping complex and pavilion that will serve as a hub for football activities each month. Additionally, after the inauguration an exhibition match between Kerala Police and the District Football Association took place. Taking this event into consideration, the district administration and sports council are now embarking on plans to establish the stadium as a main venue for regular tournaments.

Malabar Premier League 
The Malappuram District Sports Council, in collaboration with the Kerala Football Association, initiated the Malabar Premier League to foster young footballers from the district into a competitive playing environment, making football more professionalized. The official logo and eight franchises were revealed on 2 March 2015. The first season of the league will utilize two stadiums, namely the Malappuram District Sports Complex Stadium and Kottappadi Football Stadium. The MSP Delta Force won the first Malabar Premier League.

2021–22 Santosh Trophy 
Kerala emerged triumphant in the 75th Santosh Trophy 2022, defeating West Bengal 5-4 on penalties at the Payyanad Stadium in Malappuram. The match ended in a 1-1 draw after extra time, despite both teams having created several opportunities to break the deadlock.

Jijo Joseph was awarded player of the match for his stellar performances in midfield - this success marks Kerala's third Santosh Trophy win on home turf, having previously won at Kochi's Manjeri Stadium in 1973-74 and 1992-93. 37 teams started out in the qualifiers while ten teams made it through to compete in the final round of Santosh Trophy at Malappuram, with the Kottappadi and Payyanad stadiums hosting respective matches.

2021–22 Santosh Trophy Matches in Kottappadi

Coaching & practice
Currently Kerala Blasters FC Coaching center is stationed here along with city level coaching provided by Municipality. The stadium is home ground for Malappuram FC and was the practice turf for Gokulam FC. In the 2019–20 Kerala Premier League, the stadium served as home ground for Luca Soccer Club.

Facilities
It has dressing rooms for two teams, rest rooms, referee rooms, VIP pavilion, two guest rooms and medical facilities. Stadium can accommodate 8,000 to 10,000 persons. Floodlights will be erected in the second phase of the renovation. And plans are there to increase the seating capacity so that bigger matches may be conducted.

References 

Football venues in Kerala
Sports venues in Kerala
Buildings and structures in Malappuram district
Year of establishment missing